Lords and Ladies or Lords-and-ladies can be:
 Arum maculatum, a flowering plant
 Arum italicum, Italian lords and ladies,  a flowering plant
 An alternate name in North America for the harlequin duck
 Lords and Ladies (novel), a Discworld novel by Terry Pratchett
 Members of the peerage